Ebalia is a genus of crab in the family Leucosiidae.

Ebalia abdominalis Nobili, 1906
Ebalia affinis Miers, 1881
Ebalia agglomus Barnard, 1955
Ebalia barnardi Stebbing, 1914
Ebalia bituberculata Miers, 1879
Ebalia braminae Ihle, 1918
Ebalia brevimana Campbell, 1971
Ebalia cariosa (Stimpson, 1860)
Ebalia clarionensis Rathbun, 1935
Ebalia conifera Ortmann, 1892
Ebalia cranchii Leach, 1817
Ebalia crassipes (Bell, 1885)
Ebalia cristata Rathbun, 1898
Ebalia cryptocnemoides Takeda & Miyake, 1972
Ebalia dentifrons Miers, 1886
Ebalia deshayesi Lucas, 1846
Ebalia diadumena Alcock, 1896
Ebalia dimorphoides Sakai, 1963
Ebalia discrepans Costa in Hope, 1851
Ebalia edwardsii Costa, 1838
Ebalia erosa (A. Milne Edwards, 1873)
Ebalia fragifera Miers, 1881
Ebalia glans (Alcock, 1896)
Ebalia glomus Stebbing, 1921
Ebalia granulata (Rüppell, 1830)
Ebalia granulosa H. Milne Edwards, 1837
Ebalia hancocki Rathbun, 1933
Ebalia hayamaensis Sakai, 1963
Ebalia heterochalaza Kemp, 1918
Ebalia humilis Takeda, 1977
Ebalia intermedia Miers, 1886
Ebalia jordani Rathbun, 1906
Ebalia lacertosa Nobili, 1906
Ebalia laevis (Bell, 1885)
Ebalia lambriformis (Bell, 1885)
Ebalia longimana Ortmann, 1892
Ebalia longispinosa Ihle, 1918
Ebalia magdalenensis Rathbun, 1933
Ebalia maldivensis Borradaile, 1903
Ebalia nana Ihle, 1918
Ebalia nobilii Balss, 1916
Ebalia nudipes Sakai, 1963
Ebalia nux A. Milne-Edwards, 1883
Ebalia orientalis Kossmann, 1877
Ebalia paratuberculosa Türkay, Chen & Zarenkov in Chen & Sun, 2002
Ebalia philippinensis Chen, 1989
Ebalia pondoensis Barnard, 1955
Ebalia postulans Stebbing, 1910
Ebalia punctulata Sakai, 1983
Ebalia quadrata A. Milne-Edwards, 1873
Ebalia quadridentata Gray, 1831
Ebalia ramsayi (Haswell, 1880)
Ebalia rhomboidalis Miers, 1879
Ebalia rotundata (A. Milne-Edwards, 1880)
Ebalia sakaii Takeda & Miyake, 1972
Ebalia salamensis Doflein, 1904
Ebalia scabriuscula Ortmann, 1892
Ebalia scandens Stebbing, 1910
Ebalia sculpta Zarenkov, 1990
Ebalia serenei Chen, 1989
Ebalia spinifera Miers, 1886
Ebalia spinosa A. Milne-Edwards, 1873
Ebalia stellaris Naruse & Ng, 2006
Ebalia stimpsoni A. Milne-Edwards, 1880
Ebalia tosaensis Sakai, 1963
Ebalia tuberculata Miers, 1881
Ebalia tuberculosa (A. Milne-Edwards, 1873)
Ebalia tuberosa (Pennant, 1777)
Ebalia tumefacta (Montagu, 1808)
Ebalia woodmasoni Alcock, 1896
Ebalia yokoyai Sakai, 1965
Ebalia ypsilon (Ortmann, 1895)

References

Crabs